
Year 216 (CCXVI) was a leap year starting on Monday (link will display the full calendar) of the Julian calendar. At the time, it was known as the Year of the Consulship of Sabinus and Anullinus (or, less frequently, year 969 Ab urbe condita). The denomination 216 for this year has been used since the early medieval period, when the Anno Domini calendar era became the prevalent method in Europe for naming years.

Events 
 By place 

 Roman Empire 
 The Baths of Caracalla in Rome are completed with public baths (Thermae), reading rooms, auditoriums, running tracks, and public gardens that cover 20 acres.
 Emperor Caracalla tricks the Parthians by accepting a marriage proposal. He slaughters his bride and the wedding guests after the celebrations.
 Caracalla provokes a war with Artabanus V (of Parthia) to imitate his idol Alexander the Great. He crosses the Tigris, destroys towns and spoils the tombs of Arbela. The Roman army annexes Armenia.
 The basilica of Leptis Magna, ordered by Septimius Severus, is completed.

 China 
 Chinese warlord Cao Cao is made a vassal and ruler of Wei (Former Wei) by Emperor Xian, the last ruler of the Han Dynasty.

 By topic 

 Religion 
 Mithraism, which had begun in Persia, is on course to be adopted by many Roman soldiers serving in Asia.

Births 
 Mani, prophet and founder of Manichaeism (d. 274)

Deaths 
 Clement of Alexandria, Greek theologian (approximate date) 
 Cui Yan (or Jigui), Chinese official and politician (b. 165)
 Huo Jun (or Zhongmiao), Chinese general and official 
 Mao Jie (or Xiaoxian), Chinese official and politician
 Narcissus of Jerusalem, patriarch of Jerusalem 
 Pantaenus, Greek theologian (approximate date)
 Zhang Lu, Chinese warlord and religious leader

References